William D. Bradford (August 28, 1921 – August 22, 2000) was a relief pitcher in Major League Baseball who played in one game for the Kansas City Athletics during the 1956 season.

On April 24, 1956, Bradford debuted with the Athletics in the eight inning of a game against the Detroit Tigers. In two innings of work, he allowed two earned runs on two hits with a walk and no strikeouts, and never appeared in a major league game again.

See also
Cup of coffee

External links

Retrosheet Boxscore: Detroit Tigers 7, Kansas City Athletics 4, April 24, 1956

Kansas City Athletics players
Major League Baseball pitchers
Baseball players from Arkansas
People from Choctaw, Arkansas
1921 births
2000 deaths
San Francisco Seals (baseball) players
Buffalo Bisons (minor league) players
Little Rock Travelers players
Amarillo Gold Sox players
Yakima Bears players
Binghamton Triplets players
Minneapolis Millers (baseball) players